5-Iodowillardiine is a selective agonist for the kainate receptor, with only limited effects at the AMPA receptor. It is selective for kainate receptors composed of GluR5 subunits. It is an excitotoxic neurotoxin in vivo, but has proved highly useful for characterising the subtypes and function of the various kainate receptors in the brain and spinal cord.

References

Neurotoxins
Kainate receptor agonists
Pyrimidines
Amino acid derivatives
Iodoarenes